Unesco Collection: A Musical Anthology of the Orient is a series of recordings of traditional music that was made for the International Music Council by the International Institute for Comparative Music Studies and Documentation (Berlin/Venice) and released on the Musicaphon label by Bärenreiter (Kassel/Basel/London). The series was directed by Alain Daniélou.

It was part of the larger and longer enduring UNESCO Collection series.

Recordings
 Laos — BM 30 L 2001
Reissued by Rounder as Anthology of world music: The music of Laos, CD 5119.  Review by Terry E. Miller and Jarernchai Chonpairot: Asian Music 11, #1 (1979), pp. 124-139, .    Review by Eugene Chadbourne on Allmusic, [].
 Cambodia — BM 30 L 2002
Reviewed, along with Laos, by George P. Springer in Ethnomusicology 9, #3 (September 1965), pp. 337-340, .
 Afghanistan — BM 30 L 2003
Reissued by Rounder as Anthology of world music: The music of Afghanistan, CD 5121.  Review by John Baily in Yearbook for Traditional Music 35 (2003), pp. 229-230, .  Review by Adam Greenberg on Allmusic, [].
 Iran I, II — BM 30 L 2004, BM 30 L 2005
These two albums reissued by Rounder as Anthology of World Music: Iran, CD 5122/5123.  Review by Hormoz Farhat: Ethnomusicology 6, #3 (Sep. 1962), pp. 239-241, ; review by Richie Unterberger on Allmusic, [].  Also, the first five albums in the series (Laos through Iran II) are reviewed by L. E. R. P. in Journal of the International Folk Music Council 14 (1962), pp. 140-142, .
 India I, II, III, IV — BM 30 L 2006, BM 30 L 2007, BM 30 L 2018, BM 30 L 2021
 Tunisia — BM 30 L 2008
 Tibet I, II, III — BM 30 L 2009, BM 30 L 2010, BM 30 L 2011
These three albums reissued by Rounder as Anthology of World Music: Music of Tibetan Buddhism, CD 5129/5130/5131.  Review by Wei Li in Yearbook for Traditional Music 32 (2000), pp. 239-241, ; review by Adam Greenberg on Allmusic, [].
 Japan I, II, III, IV, V, VI — BM 30 L 2012, BM 30 L 2013, BM 30 L 2014, BM 30 L 2015, BM 30 L 2016, BM 30 L 2017
These six albums reviewed by W. Adriaansz in Ethnomusicology 12, #3 (September 1968), pp. 463-468, .
 Turkey I, II — BM 30 L 2019, BM 30 L 2020
 Vietnam I: The Tradition of Hue — BM 30 L 2022
 Vietnam II: The Music of South Viet-Nam —BM 30 L 2023
This album was reissued as Auvidis D 8070 (1996).  Also, the two albums above were reissued by Rounder as Anthology of World Music: The music of Vietnam, CD 5140.  Review of Vietnam I/II by W. Adriaansz: Ethnomusicology 16, #2 (May 1972), pp. 308-310, .  Review by Adam Greenberg on Allmusic, [].
 Azerbaijan I — BM 30 L 2024
Reissued by Rounder as Anthology of World Music: The music of Azerbaijan, CD 5142.  Review by Adam Greenberg on Allmusic, [].
 Georgia I — BM 30 L 2025
 Malaysia — BM 30 L 2026
 Morocco — BM 30 L 2027
Reissued by Rounder as Anthology of World Music: Music of Islam and Sufism in Morocco, CD 5145.  Review by Adam Greenberg on Allmusic, [].
 Kurdish music — BM 30 SL 2028
 Pakistan — BM 30 SL 2029
Reissued by Rounder as Anthology of World Music: The Music of Pakistan, CD 5147.  Review by Peter Row in Ethnomusicology 25, #3 (September 1981), pp. 559-561, .  Review by David Henderson in Yearbook for Traditional Music 36 (2004), pp. 193-194, .  Review by Adam Greenberg on Allmusic, [].
 Lebanon I — BM 30 SL 2030
Reissued by Rounder as Anthology of world music: Lebanon, CD 5148.  Review by Adam Greenberg on Allmusic, [].
 Indonesia I — BM 30 L 2031
 China — BM 30 SL 2032
Reissued as Auvidis D 8071 (1996).  Also reissued by Rounder as Anthology of World Music: China, CD 5150.  Review by Han Kuo-Huang in Ethnomusicology 33, #3 (Autumn 1989), pp. 567-569, .  Review by Adam Greenberg on Allmusic, [].

See also 
Anthology of Indian Classical Music - A Tribute to Alain Daniélou
UNESCO Collection

References

External links 
Alain Danielou
Unesco Collection: A Musical Anthology of the Orient Records Listing

Asian music
Traditional music